Second Time Round is the second studio album by British funk group Cymande. It was released in 1973 through Janus Records and produced entirely by John Schroeder. Recording sessions took place at De Lane Lea Studios in London.

The album peaked at number 180 on the Billboard 200 and number 41 on the Top R&B/Hip-Hop Albums in the United States. Its lead single "Fug" later appeared in the 2007 video game Tony Hawk's Proving Ground.

Track listing

Personnel 
 Ray King – vocals, percussion
 Peter Serreo – tenor saxophone
 Michael "Bami" Rose – alto saxophone, flute, bongos
 Pablo Gonsales – Congas
 Sam Kelly – drums
 Joey Dee – vocals, percussion
 Derek Gibbs – alto and soprano saxophone
 Steve Scipio – bass
 Patrick Eaton Patterson – guitar
 John Schroeder – producer, liner notes
 Mia Krinsky – coordinator

Charts

References

External links 

1973 albums
Cymande albums
Janus Records albums
Albums produced by John Schroeder (musician)